The 2014 World Nomad Games, officially known as the 1st World Nomad Games, was the inaugural edition held in Cholpon-Ata, Kyrgyzstan from 9–14 September 2014 with 19 sports featured in the games. While organising the first edition of the Games, the Kyrgyz government spent more than 3 million dollars. More than 400 athletes from 20 countries took part in the event.

A cultural program 
The Games are surrounded by a cultural and ethnical program. During the first edition of the Games, a yurt village was installed. Cultural events and entertaining activities not linked with the Games' disciplines also took place.

Competitive sports
Ten sports weree played competitively at the games:
 The equestrian sports of
 , team game on horseback, featuring the carrying of a goat carcass
 , wrestling on horseback
 , a young horse race
 , (aka ) a trotting race
 , a long distance uneven terrain race
 The traditional wrestling sports of:
 Kyrgyz 
  (belt-wrestling)
 Kazakh 
 Two Kyrgyz national games:
 , an ankle bone shooting game
 , a strategy board game

Demonstration sports
The games also featured demonstration performances of other sports:
 Zorhana, a form of wrestling from Azerbaijan and Iran
  (from Turkey), a sport played on horseback
 Traditional Turkish wrestling
  (from the Republic of Korea)
 , eagle hunting
 , picking up a coin while upon a galloping horse
 , ("girl chasing"), featuring a woman and a man on horseback, the man initially chasing the woman, but if too slow then being chased and whipped by the woman

Medal table
The Kyrgyz team won the most medals, with the Kazakh team coming second and Turkmenistan third.

External links
 "Big in Kyrgyzstan: The World Nomad Games", The Atlantic

References

World Nomad Games
World Nomad Games
World Nomad Games
World Nomad Games
International sports competitions hosted by Kyrgyzstan
Multi-sport events in Kyrgyzstan